The East Midlands Women's cricket team was the women's representative cricket team for the East Midlands. They competed in the Women's Area Championship from 1980 to 1996 and in the Women's County Championship from 1997 to 1999, after which they were replaced by Nottinghamshire. They won three Area Championships, and were also County Champions in their final season of competing in the tournament.

History
East Midlands Women played their first recorded match in 1963, which they lost to a touring Australia side by 133 runs. East Midlands played Australia again in 1976, and played New Zealand in 1984, as well as playing various one-off games against other English sides. East Midlands joined the Women's Area Championship for its inaugural season in 1980, and played in the tournament until it ended in 1996. They, along with Yorkshire, dominated the final 10 years of the tournament, winning the title three teams and finishing as runners-up a further four times.

East Midlands joined the Women's County Championship upon its inception in 1997, playing in Division 2. They were promoted in 1998 and then were crowned Champions in 1999, winning all five of their matches to top Division 1. For the following season, however, East Midlands were replaced by Nottinghamshire and the team was disbanded.

Players

Notable players
Players who played for East Midlands and played internationally are listed below, in order of first international appearance (noted in brackets):

 Rachael Heyhoe Flint (1960)
 Enid Bakewell (1968)
 Karen Smithies (1987)
 Jo Chamberlain (1987)
 Wendy Watson (1987)
 Terri Bennett (1990)
 Jane Smit (1992)
 Sue Redfern (1995)
 Ella Donnison (1999)
 Dawn Holden (1999)
 Kate Lowe (1999)
 Nicky Shaw (1999)

Seasons

Women's County Championship

Honours
 Women's Area Championship:
 Champions – 1989, 1990, 1991
 Women's County Championship:
 Champions – 1999

See also
 Nottinghamshire Women cricket team
 List of defunct English women's cricket teams

References

Cricket in Nottinghamshire
Cricket in Derbyshire
Cricket in Leicestershire
Women's cricket teams in England